The Charles W. Eisemann Center, for Performing Arts and Corporate Presentations is a performance hall which opened in September 2002 in Richardson, Texas. The center is named for local philanthropist, Charles W. Eisemann, in recognition of a US$2,000,000 gift from the Eisemann Foundation Fund of The Communities Foundation of Texas. It is the primary performance venue for the Plano Symphony Orchestra and the Richardson Symphony Orchestra.

Facility
The Eisemann Center features three performance halls, the Margaret and Al Hill Performance Hall, the Bank of America Theater and the Bank of America Hall. All venues are connected by a lobby on three levels. Designed by architect Eurico R. Francisco, AIA, of RTKL, the building was honored with design awards from the Dallas Chapter of the American Institute of Architects in 2001 ("Unbuilt Honor Award") and again in 2003 ("Built Honor Award"), in addition to receiving a "Best of Texas Award" for buildings over $50 million from McGraw Hill in 2002. 

David Dillon, the late architecture critic for the Dallas Morning News and Architecture Record, described the Eisemann Center as "...bold, contemporary and every bit the civic showpiece that city officials have been hoping for. Architect Eurico Francisco based his design on classic modernist principles of light, transparency, clean details and honest use of materials. Not a faux column or cornice anywhere. Although the Eisemann does not break new ground, it covers familiar territory with grace and assurance. (...) Collectively, (these details) make the difference between a static building and a dynamic one. They force us to look at things a second time, to question and to explore, all engaging qualities of good architecture."

Margaret and Al Hill Performance Hall
The Margaret and Al Hill Performance Hall is a 1,563-seat venue and is one of the largest stage areas in the DFW Metroplex. The construction of this hall was designed to meet the production needs for dance, opera, and musical theater as well as other events. By featuring a full working stage house, an adjustable proscenium opening, orchestra pit and lift, customized Wenger orchestra shell,  of stage space, wood sprung floor, and a full lighting and sound package, the Hill Performance Hall can accommodate almost any production. The audience chamber was built with acoustically sculpted natural wood-clad walls which assist in diminishing sound vibrations for symphonic music, dance, theater, opera, and a wide range of concerts and other events.

Bank of America Theater
Built as a flexible and versatile performance space the Bank of America Theater seats between 230 and 400 people, depending on the configuration. The space can also be converted to a thrust or full round performance venue by extending the stage into the middle of the audience chamber. In addition, an exposed catwalk system allows lighting from all angles.

Bank of America Hall
The Bank of America Hall provides space for hosting private receptions, banquets, meetings, seminars, recitals, small tradeshows and exhibits. The  room features a barrel vaulted ceiling, cove lighting, hardwood flooring and a full range of A/V production equipment. A catering prep kitchen is located adjacent to the room to assist caterers with servicing these occasions. Depending on the setup of the room, it can hold up to 180 for a seated dinner and up to 300 for receptions. Pre/post-event activities may also be held in the Bank of America Hall in conjunction with the use of the larger performance venue.

Lobby and Public Areas
The Eisemann Center offers patrons a  lobby spanning three levels. A staircase leads up to the Green Mezzanine-Gallery which features the art gallery, while another staircase takes patrons to the TXU Lobby and the Bank of America Hall. Cast-stone and natural wood walls, terrazzo floors and a wide expanse of glass create a dramatic and welcoming sense of occasion.

The ticket office handles all online purchases as well as walk-up sales, telephone, fax and mail inquiries.

Seven Muses artwork
The City of Richardson and supporters of the Charles W. Eisemann Center celebrated the completion and unveiling of the lightpainting “Seven Muses” by artist Stephen Knapp in April 2006. The commission of the lightpainting was made possible by a gift to the City from Jim and Gayla Von Ehr of Richardson.

In an interview with Adrienne Garnett in Art of the Times, Knapp, when asked about “Seven Muses” said, “I want people to see and feel the energy that is emanating from the center of it. I want people to see the subtleties, not just the bright colors that are associated with my work. A lot of time is dedicated to making this about discovering extraordinary possibilities with light.”

Location

The Eisemann Center is part of an urban village setting. The center is between the Renaissance Dallas-Richardson Hotel and the Galatyn Park DART station to the west and a number of multi-use buildings to the east and southeast including offices, restaurants, and residential complexes.

A public plaza features a water fountain.

Updates
In 2008, the Eisemann Center received a US$500,000 grant from the Texas Instruments Foundation, to be used for a variety of projects that included a custom designed orchestra shell for the theater, additional interior and exterior signage, sound and lighting system upgrades, audiovisual equipment enhancements and facility system upgrades to enhance patron comfort.

In a City Council worksession on October 26, 2009, Eisemann Center management gave a status update on the Eisemann Center Foundation as well as on the capital improvements funded by the grant.

Eisemann Center Foundation
The Eisenman Center Foundation is used as a mechanism to receive philanthropic donations toward the Eisenman Center that need to be made to a 501c(3) organization. It was incorporated in the State of Texas in March 2002, and was granted recognition as a charitable foundation by the IRS in July 2002. This determination was reaffirmed by the IRS in December 2006.

The Foundation states, "[t]he primary purpose of the Corporation is to assist the City of Richardson, Texas and local groups and organizations to promote, support, improve and enhance the visual and performing arts at the Charles W. Eisenman Center for the Performing Arts and Corporate Presentations through the acceptance of land, bequests, and other donations to further the purpose of the Corporation."

References

External links
 EisemannCenter.com, official web site
 Rumorcheck.org, local website with some additional detail on the Eisemann Center Foundation

Concert halls in Texas
Music venues in Texas
Music hall
Theatres in Texas
Arts centers in Texas
Performing arts centers in Texas
Buildings and structures in Dallas County, Texas
Tourist attractions in Dallas County, Texas
Event venues established in 2002
2002 establishments in Texas
Richardson, Texas